James Bacon (May 12, 1914 – September 18, 2010) was an American author and journalist who also worked as an actor in film and television.  He wrote historical accounts of his years observing Hollywood and a biography of Jackie Gleason.

Life and career
Bacon was born in Buffalo, New York. He attended the University of Notre Dame from 1933–1936, dropping out during his senior year in order to help his parents, who had recently lost their home in a flood. He earned his degree in journalism  in 1943 from Syracuse University and then served in the Navy. After leaving the Associated Press in 1966, he wrote briefly for The Hollywood Reporter and then for 17 years for The Los Angeles Herald-Examiner. He had published a weekly column in Beverly Hills [213] magazine since 1996.

Although a columnist by trade, Bacon appeared in numerous films, generally in walk-on cameos, often as reporters or newsmen. He appeared in all five films in the 'Planet of the Apes' series, becoming the only actor to do so. He portrayed an ape in each of the films with the exception of Escape from the Planet of the Apes, in which he played a human, General Faulkner. This was the only film of the 'Ape' series in which he was credited. 

Bacon penned three books in the 1970s and 1980s. His first book, Hollywood is a Four Letter Town, was published in 1977. Its sequel, Made in Hollywood, was published in 1978.

Bacon wrote a biography on Jackie Gleason, which was published in 1985, entitled How Sweet It Is: The Jackie Gleason Story. In 1999, Bacon was the subject of an E! True Hollywood Story episode. Bacon received star on the Hollywood Walk of Fame on April 6, 2007.

Death
Bacon died in his sleep from congestive heart failure on September 18, 2010, aged 96.

Selected filmography

Black Tuesday (1954) .... Reporter at Electrocution (uncredited)
The Boss (1956) .... Himself (uncredited)
Teacher's Pet (1958) .... Himself (uncredited)
Al Capone (1959) .... Reporter (uncredited)
The Big Circus (1959) .... Himself - Reporter (uncredited)
The Rebel (1960, TV Series) .... Dude
Pay or Die (1960) .... Subway Guard (uncredited)
College Confidential (1960) .... Himself - Reporter
The Roaring 20's (1960, TV Series) .... Jim
Pepe (1960) .... Bartender (uncredited)
Cry for Happy (1961) .... Press Correspondent (uncredited)
Underworld U.S.A. (1961) .... Newspaperman (uncredited)
The Big Bankroll (1961) .... Investment Man (uncredited)
The Oscar (1966) .... Reporter (uncredited)
Way... Way Out (1966) .... Reporter (uncredited)
Planet of the Apes (1968) .... Ape (uncredited)
The Big Valley (1969, TV Series) .... Hotel Clerk
80 Steps to Jonah (1969) .... Hobo
Skullduggery (1970) .... Commentator
Beneath the Planet of the Apes (1970) .... Ape (uncredited)
Men From Shiloh, the rebranded name of The Virginian (1970, TV Series) ... 2nd Reporter
Escape from the Planet of the Apes (1971) .... General Faulkner
The Seven Minutes (1971) .... Reporter (as Jim Bacon)
Adam-12 (1971, TV Series) .... Newsman
Conquest of the Planet of the Apes (1972) .... Ape (uncredited)
Night Gallery (1972, TV Series) .... Reporter
Battle for the Planet of the Apes (1973) .... Gorilla Soldier (uncredited)
Sssssss (1973) .... Spectator (uncredited)
The Outfit (1973) .... Bookie
Planet Earth (1974, TV Movie) .... Partha
 How to Seduce a Woman (1974) .... Himself
Half a House (1975) .... Jordan's client
Tunnel Vision (1976) .... Gene Scallion
The Last Hard Men (1976) .... Deputy Jetfore
High Velocity (1976) .... Monroe
The Legend of Frank Woods (1977) .... Cowboy
Viva Knievel! (1977) .... Reporter (uncredited)
Rollercoaster (1977) .... Reporter (uncredited)
The Amazing Howard Hughes (1977) .... Himself (as Jim Bacon)
Capricorn One (1977) .... Reporter Number 4
Mean Dog Blues (1978) .... Court Clerk
Sextette (1978) .... Reporter
Good Guys Wear Black (1978) .... Senator
The One Man Jury (1978) .... Reporter
South by Southwest (1978, TV Series) .... Reporter
Cat in the Cage (1978) .... Police Captain
Meteor (1979) .... News Reporter
The Man with Bogart's Face (1980) .... Reporter
Underground Aces (1981) .... Businessman #2
Charlie Chan and the Curse of the Dragon Queen (1981) .... Reporter at Clinic
The Longshot (1986) .... Track Usher
Vasectomy: A Delicate Matter (1986) .... Vet (final film role)

References

External links
 
 
 Notre Dame Magazine Spring 2003 Issue

1914 births
2010 deaths
American biographers
American male biographers
American columnists
American male film actors
American memoirists
American reporters and correspondents
American male television actors
University of Notre Dame alumni
Associated Press reporters
Writers from Buffalo, New York
American film historians
Syracuse University alumni
American male journalists
Journalists from New York (state)